Group D of the 2017 Africa Cup of Nations qualification tournament was one of the thirteen groups to decide the teams which qualified for the 2017 Africa Cup of Nations finals tournament. The group consisted of four teams: Burkina Faso, Uganda, Botswana, and Comoros.

The teams played against each other home-and-away in a round-robin format, between June 2015 and September 2016.

Burkina Faso, the group winners, qualified for the 2017 Africa Cup of Nations, while group runners-up Uganda also qualified due to being one of the two group runners-up with the best records.

Standings

Matches

Goalscorers
2 goals

 Joel Mogorosi

1 goal

 Onkabetse Makgantai
 Galabgwe Moyana
 Thabang Sesinyi
 Aristide Bancé
 Banou Diawara
 Préjuce Nakoulma
 Jonathan Pitroipa
 Alain Traoré
 Jonathan Zongo
 Youssouf M'Changama
 El Fardou Ben Nabouhane
 Khalid Aucho
 Luwagga Kizito
 Geofrey Massa
 Tony Mawejje
 Farouk Miya
 Brian Umony

Notes

References

External links
Orange Africa Cup Of Nations Qualifiers 2017, CAFonline.com

Group D